Dan Howard Wilks and Farris Cullen Wilks, also known as the Wilks Brothers, are American petroleum industry businessmen. Sons of a bricklayer, the brothers established Wilks Masonry in 1995. They went on to found an early hydraulic fracking company, Frac Tech, in 2002, and eventually became billionaires. In 2011 they sold their 70% interest in Frac Tech for $3.5 billion. They reside in Cisco, Texas.

They are major investors in and funders of conservative causes, including The Daily Wire, PragerU, and the 2016 presidential campaign of Senator Ted Cruz.

Personal lives

Early lives
The brothers are sons of Myrtle and Voy Wilks of Cisco in Eastland County, east of Abilene, Texas. When the brothers were born, their father worked as a bricklayer and the family was destitute; the brothers once slept in a goat shed.

Assembly of Yahweh (7th day)
In 1947 Voy and Myrtle Wilks along with Myrtle's father Charles Fenter were disfellowshipped from the Churches of Christ and founded a church which was at first called simply “A Church of Christ.” The church is not Christian, believing that Yahweh is the only god and that Jesus (called Yahushua) is a separate entity. In early 1952 Charles restricted communion to once a year rather than weekly and moved worship from Sunday to Saturday. The Fenters and Wilkses along with a few other families left the congregation and began to meet in private homes. When Charles died in May 1952, Voy took over the congregation and the couple and their five children continued to live at the home of Charles’ widow, Annie.

In 1962 they adopted the name Church of God (7th day) (not to be confused with Church of God (Seventh-Day)); in 1982 the church became the Assembly of Yahweh (7th day). Currently the Assembly of Yahweh (7th day) is a conservative Jews for Jesus-type congregation. It teaches that "the true religion is Jewish (not a Gentile religion)" and its members celebrate the Old Testament holidays rather than those related to the New Testament. The congregation considers the Old Testament historically and scientifically accurate. The congregation considers homosexuality and abortion to be crimes.

Farris Wilks
Farris Wilks is married to Jo Ann and is the father of 11 children. He is the current pastor and bishop of the Assembly of Yahweh (7th day) near Cisco. In sermons, he has denounced homosexuality and abortion rights.

Frac Tech
In 2002 the brothers founded a hydraulic fracturing company called Frac Tech. In 2011 they sold their 70% interest in Frac Tech for $3.5 billion.

Post Frac Tech business history

Idaho land purchase and restrictions 
As early as 2016 the Wilks Brothers began purchasing large quantities of land in Central Idaho, mainly in Ada, Boise, and Valley counties. They restricted access to the locals with gates, with anti-vehicle ditches, and with no-trespassing signs appearing soon after their acquisitions. They informed Valley County that they were terminating leases to roads and snowmobile trails, including a main road which was the only access to public lands. According to the United States Forest Service, some of the brothers' restrictions were illegal. The brothers' frequent refusal to allow hunting, snowmobiling, firewood cutting and transit frustrated locals. In 2017 a video emerged of an armed and uniformed DF Development security guard illegally expelling an outdoorsman from a public road, Forest Road 409 (Clear Creek Road), which runs through Wilks brothers land, on grounds of trespass. According to the Valley County Roads Department superintendent, the DF Development guard was in the wrong, as both the road and a 33-foot easement on either side belong to the county, and as such are public land.

As of 2019 the Wilks brothers' shell company, DF Development, owned approximately 75,000 acres of land across 306 parcels in Valley County. Overall the Wilks brothers own about 200,000 acres in Idaho.

As of 2018, many of the parcels of land owned by the Wilks Brothers have been listed for sale via Wilks Ranch Brokers, LLC. As of 2019, Wilks Ranch Brokers had listed 54,000 acres of Idaho land for sale.

Montana land purchase and restrictions 

In Montana, the Wilks brothers asked the Bureau of Land Management if they could swap a piece of their Duffee Hills ranch for a parcel of public land. This request was denied after local hunters objected on the grounds that the brothers had closed down an access road to the wild and scenic Missouri River.

Political activity

Elections and campaigns

 The Wilks brothers supported Texas U.S. Senator Ted Cruz in the 2016 United States presidential election, contributing $15 million to a super political action committee backing Cruz.
 They gave $50,000 in 2016 to the candidacy of Jeff Judson, who unsuccessfully challenged fellow Republican Joe Straus, Speaker of the Texas House of Representatives, in the District 121 Republican legislative primary in March 2016. 
 Farris Wilks gave $75,000 to Jeff Cason in the 2020 Republican primary in the contest to replace Jonathan Stickland in Texas State House District 92.
 Their Defend Texas Liberty PAC gave more than $3 million to the Don Huffines 2022 Texas gubernatorial campaign.

Political media

The Wilks brothers were early investors in political commentator Ben Shapiro's media company The Daily Wire, a conservative news and opinion website in 2015. Additionally, the Wilks Brothers provided early stage funding to Prager University, a YouTube channel and media company started by Dennis Prager to further conservative causes to a young audience. They are major donors to conservative advocacy group Empower Texans.

References

Ted Cruz
American billionaires
American Christians
People from Cisco, Texas
Texas Republicans
Businesspeople from Texas
Sibling duos